The  is a river which flows through the northwest quadrant of central Tokyo, Japan. It is one of the tributaries of the Arakawa River.

It springs up in Koganei Park in the district of Hana-koganei-minami-chō, in the city of Kodaira. It then flows in an easterly direction through the city of Nishitōkyō. Next, it continues through the special wards of Tokyo of Nerima-ku, Itabashi-ku and Kita-ku. At Horifune, Kita-ku, it empties into the Sumida River.

Bridges
The Shakujii River has 66 bridges over its upstream portion. There are 62 over its middle basin. And there are 66 bridges over its downstream portion. This makes for a total of 194 bridges.

The bridge has now been replaced by a modern ferroconcrete one called Ita Bridge.

Coordinates
River source: 

Confluence with Sumida River:

Gallery

References

External links
 National Diet Library, Japan article

Rivers of Tokyo
Rivers of Japan